Christian August Broberg (3 April 1811 – 30 April 1886) was a Danish merchant, ship, owner and politician. His company, C. Broberg & Søn, founded by his father in 1805, was the largest importer of coffee to the Nordic countries in the 1860s and early 1870s but collapsed during the coffee crisis of 1874 as a result of high-risk, speculative transactions undertaken by his son.

Early life and education
Broberg was born in Copenhagen, the son of merchant and ship-owner Christian Mortensen Broberg (1776–1852) and Anna Cosine Edsleff (1774–1851). He became an apprentice in his father's office from 1828 and then continued his education abroad. He came to Messina in 1832 where he worked for Ferd. Baller & Co. and became a partner. He returned to Copenhagen in 1835.

Chr. Broberg & Søn
Broberg's father had established his company in 1805 and it acquired its first ship Aurora in 1814. It was initially involved in the import of exotic fruit and other colonial goods from Asia but would later specialize in the lucrative coffee trade.

On 1 January 1836, Broberg became a partner in the family firm which now changed its name to Chr. Broberg & Søn. He headed the company after his father's death in 1852. Chr. Broberg & Søn was the first trading house in the Nordic countries which established direct trade relations to Brazil (E. Jonston & Co., Rio and Santos) in competition with those in Hamburg. He brought the coffee home in his own fleet of merchant ships and became one of the largest ship-owners in Denmark of his time. In the 1860s, it was by far the largest Nordic importer of coffee.

Broberg & Søn was hit hard by the 1874 international coffee crisis. Christian August Broberg was abroad and had left the company in the hands of his son, Carl August B.s (1846–1917), who had engaged in risky, speculative transactions. Broberg hurried back to Copenhagen but was unable to prevent the loss of almost his entire fortune.

Ships
This list is incomplete

Other occupations
 
Broberg was also involved in the establishment of a number of other ventures. He was elected for the board of representatives of the Bank of Denmark in 1844. Broberg was a driving force behind the appointment of Carl Frederik Tietgen to bank manager and later secured him extensive freedom of action. Broberg was a board member of many of the successful companies later founded by Tietgen.

Politics, public office and honors
Broberg was a member of Grosserersocietetet's committee from February 1743 to 1863 and was its vice president from February 1856.

He was a member of the Copenhagen City Council from 1845 to 1851 and was elected to the Folketinget in Copenhagen's 2nd constituency in December 1849. He ran for reelection in the same constituency but lost to Alfred Hage. He was instead reelected in the 3rd constituency in the by-election in July 1854, but left the office in May 1856 after being elected to Rigsrådet (Privy Council) in February that same year. He was a member of  until 1863 and was elected to the Landsting in 1864 but left office in 1866. From 1882 to 1886, he was persuaded to return to the Landsting. As a politician, he was mainly interested in mercantile issues.

Broberg was awarded the Order of the Dannebrog in 1851, became Dannebrogsmand in 1854 and a Commander of the Dannebrog in 1874. He was awarded the title  in 1857.

Personal life

Broberg married Ida Frederikke Gotschalk (1814–1877), daughter of merchant and Consul-General Frederik Gotschalk (1786–1869) and Marie Frederikke Kierulf (1791–1870), on 21 November 1835 in St. Peter's Church in Copenhagen.

They had three daughters and a son. The son, Carl Broberg, continued the company after his father's retirement in 1882. The shipping activities had been discontinued after the 1874 crisis but it was still active under the name Chr. Broberg, Søn / Co. in 1910. One of Carl Broberg's daughters, Dorit Vroberg, married Harald Heering of the Heering family.

Broberg died on 30 April 1886 and is buried in the Cemetery of Holmen.
Brobergsgade, a street in Christianshavn, is named after him.

References

External links

 Christian August Broberg at geni.com
 Source

19th-century Danish businesspeople
19th-century Copenhagen City Council members
Businesspeople from Copenhagen
Danish politicians
Danish companies established in 1805
1811 births
1886 deaths